The phrase "king of herbs" may refer to:
Reishi mushroom (Ganoderma lucidum)
 Basil (Ocimum basilicum)
Ginseng (Panax ginseng)
Soma
 Tarragon (Artemisia dracunculus)

References